Vioménil is a commune in the Vosges department in Grand Est in northeastern France.

Inhabitants are known as Viamanciliens, after the Roman name of the commune, Viamansalis.

Geography
The rivers Saône and Madon have their source in the commune.  The European Watershed goes through Vioménil.

Personalities
The writer Hervé Bazin spent most of his youth here.

See also
Communes of the Vosges department

References

Communes of Vosges (department)